Lavalle is a town in Corrientes Province, Argentina. It is the capital of Lavalle Department.

Location

Lavalle is located near the Paraná River between the cities of Goya and Santa Lucía

External links
 

Populated places in Corrientes Province